Thorgeir Stubø (12 November 1943 – 22 October 1986) was a Norwegian jazz musician (guitar) and composer. He was the father of Jazz guitarist Håvard, jazz singer Kjersti and theater director Eirik Stubø, and grandfather of electronica musician Mathias Stubø.

Early life
Stubø was born and raised in Narvik, and listened to music on radio from an early age. His attention was drawn to American Jazz an especially the music of John Coltrane, Tal Farlow, Wes Montgomery, Jimmy Raney and Jim Hall was important for his early musical development. Stubø started playing the guitar in an environment of flowering jazz music in Narvik, but moved to Oslo to get his education in the 1960'es. He studied philology at the University of Oslo and got a masters with the German languish as main subject. At the Oslo Jazz scene he was soon recognised for his expressive guitar style and was often seen at the student home "Nord Norsken", performing jazz, and played with up-coming musicians like Jan Garbarek, Knut Riisnæs, Svein Christiansen and Arild Andersen.

Returning to Narvik, Stubø started working at Frydenlund high school as a teacher of language, but he was very much into the local music life. He also was a sportsman and enjoyed good results as a local skier, and loved the Northern Norway scenery as a hiker and an inspirational source.

Career
Even though getting a family and working as an ordinary teacher occupied much of his time, Stubø is regarded as the best Norwegian guitarist through all time. His first record Notice (Odin Records, 1981), with Henning Gravrok (saxophones), Bjørn Alterhaug (bass), Terje Bjørklund (piano) and Ernst-Wiggo Sandbakk (drums), all musicians from Northern Norway. It was a soft flowing album with references to Chick Corea's Jazz rock style, and was rewarded Spellemannprisen 1981. His next record, Live at Jazz Alive (Odin Records, 1983/1985), a live recording from the Jazz club Jazz Alive in Oslo, with Bernt Rosengren, Egil Kapstad, Terje Venaas and Egil Johansen, some of the best bop musicians in Scandinavia. These two records was released on the Norwegian Jazz Clubs own label, Odin Records.

Flight (Hot Club Records 1983, live recordings from 1983), with Krister Andersson (saxophones), Terje Venaas (bass), Lars Sjösten (piano), Egil Johansen (drums), Ivar Antonsen, Jesper Lundgaard and Alex Riel (drums), is a mixed studio a live recording from Tromsø with different line-ups on the two sets. On this album there is a clear influence of guitarist Pat Martino. By writing letters Stubø got in contact with the well-known guitarist Doug Raney, son of the legendaric Jazz guitarist Jimmy Raney. This led to the album Everything We Love (Hot Club, 1983/1985), with Doug Raney, Ole Jacob Hansen and Jesper Lundgaard

On the two last records Stubø was on the label Cadence Jazz Records. First came the LP Rhythm'a'ning (Cadence Jazz Records, 1986), live in Tromsø, with Krister Andersson, Lars Sjösten, Terje Venaas and Egil Johansen, (Cadence Jazz Records, 1986). This is a stylish and very consistent release, with many tunes by John Coltrane. The end of a tune (Cadence Jazz Records, 1988), with Art Farmer, Doug Raney, Ivar Antonsen, Jesper Lundgaard and Ole Jacob Hansen, marked the end of an extraordinary career.

Honors
Awarded the "Spellemannprisen" 1981 in the class Jazz, for the record Notice
Awarded the Norwegian "Buddyprisen" Jazz Prize of honor 1986
The Thorgeir Stubø Memorial Fund was established in 1987, and annually awards the "Stubøprisen" for important contributors to the Northern Norwegian jazz.

Discography 
1981: Notice (Odin)
1984: Live at Jazz Alive (Odin), live in Oslo
1985: Everything We Love (Hot Club), with Doug Raney
1985: Flight (Hot Club), live recordings from 1983
1986: Rhythm'a'ning (Cadence), live in Tromsø
1988: The End of a Tune (Cadence)

References

External links 
Biography at Jazzklubben.Narviknett.no (in Norwegian)
Biography and video at Allkunne.no (in Norwegian)

20th-century Norwegian guitarists
Norwegian jazz guitarists
Norwegian jazz composers
Spellemannprisen winners
Musicians from Narvik
1943 births
1986 deaths
20th-century Norwegian composers
Odin Records artists
Cadence Jazz Records artists
Hot Club Records artists
20th-century guitarists
20th-century jazz composers